Alice Mary Cassie (19 November 1887–17 March 1963) was a New Zealand political activist and feminist. She was born in Dundee, Angus, Scotland on 19 November 1887.

References

1887 births
1963 deaths
20th-century New Zealand politicians
New Zealand feminists
New Zealand activists
New Zealand women activists
Scottish emigrants to New Zealand
Politicians from Dundee
People from Dundee
New Zealand Labour Party politicians
20th-century New Zealand women politicians